Hermigua is a town and a municipality in the northeastern part of La Gomera in the province of Santa Cruz de Tenerife of the Canary Islands, Spain.  It is located 12 km northwest of the island's capital, San Sebastián de la Gomera. The Garajonay National Park covers the southern part of the municipality.

 
 
 
There are cedar forests in the area known as El Cedro. The valley was first inhabited by the Guanches and was known as Mulagua.  The municipality of Hermigua was founded in the 16th century as the settlement of Valle Bajo.

Settlements 
 Valle Bajo divides the settlements of El Curato and El Palmerejo
 Valle Alto divides the settlements of La Castellana and Playa Hermigua
 El Cabo
 Monteforte
 Los Estanquillos
 El Corralete
 El Convento
 La Cerca
 Las Hoyetas
 Caserío del Cedro

Historical population

Sites of interest 
 Valle Alto, the first settlement in Hermigua: its neighbourhood "El Convento" features a Dominican church and monastery built 1611; another landmark is the Escuela popular
 El Chorro waterfall
 Los Telares Museum: contains handicrafts from the surrounding area
 "Roques Pedro y Petra"
 "El Curato"
 "El Pescante" (The Old Davit)
 "El Caserío del Cedro": a hamlet by the National Park in a small isolated valley
 "Playa de La Caleta" (La Caleta Beach)
 "Ermita de San Juan"
 Mahona Natural Reserve

See also 
 List of municipalities in Santa Cruz de Tenerife

References

External links 

 La Gomera Tourist Office
 Hermigua Tourism Guide
 La Gomera Island blog

Municipalities in La Gomera